Ronal AG is a manufacturer of wheels for cars and commercial vehicles, with its headquarters in Härkingen, Switzerland. The company employs more than 8000 personnel and produces both cast and forged wheels.
The company is active in both the OEM and aftermarket for cars and commercial vehicles.

Ronal AG has thirteen wheel production facilities, two factories for tool manufacturing, a logistics center and has its own sales locations in eleven countries. The company produces approximately 21 million wheels annually for the automotive industry and its own brands Ronal, Speedline Corse and Speedline Truck. Ronal AG develops and produces its own production tools. This takes place at the sites Cantanhede in Portugal and Härkingen in Switzerland. Härkingen is home to both the headquarters and Ronal's own research and development centre.

SanSwiss GmbH, a manufacturer of shower units, based in Forst in Baden Württemberg, also belongs to Ronal Group.

History 

Ronal was founded in Germany in 1969 by Karl Wirth. The entrepreneur and Formula V driver saw a need for aluminum wheels.  Wirth thus became one of the pioneers of light alloy wheels on the global market. The first factory was opened back in 1978 in France. In 2007 Ronal AG purchased Italian wheel manufacturer Speedline, which covers the commercial vehicle segment including trucks, trailers and buses. This helped the group expand into the racing and Formula 1 sectors as well as into weight-optimized flow forming technology. 83 FIA titles have been won on Speedline Corse wheels. In 2012, Ronal expanded its range to include forged wheels with the majority stake in Fullchamp in Taiwan. In 2013, Ronal AG joined forces with the Australian company, Carbon Revolution, to launch the first one-piece carbon wheel on the European market.

Divisions 
OEM: Original equipment manufacturing for automobile manufacturers around the world
Cars: Aftermarket parts sold with the brands Ronal, Speedline Corse and Carbon Revolution
Commercial vehicles: OEM and aftermarket parts for trucks, buses and trailers with the brand Speedline Truck
SanSwiss: High quality shower units. The brand owns production plants in Germany, France, Switzerland, Czech Republic, Poland, Spain and Romania.

Technology 
Ronal AG works to make the wheels lighter with technologies such as flowforming, forging, undercuting and carbon. Furthermore, Ronal AG uses process for the surface finishing like multi color rim (MCR), pad printing, laser and diamond cutting and polishing.

External links

References 

Wheel manufacturers
Auto parts suppliers of Switzerland
Swiss brands